The Gauge War (or Gauge Wars) was a figurative war of intense competition to control new territory, waged between expanding railway companies in Great Britain in the nineteenth century. The contest for which track gauge should become the standard carried with it the greater struggle for which companies and stakeholders would win or lose in commerce, controlling or commercially dominating rights of way.

The Gauge War was arguably the earliest format war between two similar but incompatible technologies.

Origins 
As the railway companies sought to expand commercially and geographically, they wished to dominate areas of the country, hoping to exclude their competitors. The networks polarised into groups of broad gauge companies and of narrow gauge companies.

Proposed railway lines required authorisation by Act of Parliament, and an Act generally stipulated the track gauge for that line. When an independent line was promoted, the gauge used aligned the company to either the broad or narrow gauge companies. The success by one network and the failure by the other often implied the capture and loss respectively of territory far beyond the line under immediate examination.

Resolution 
A rail system with two gauges suffered from inefficiency where a break of gauge occurred. Various alternatives to costly transloading were proposed in the early era of railways, including rollbocks, transporter wagons, dual gauge, and even containerization or variable gauge axles. However, these were not actually implemented during the Gauge War in the 1840s, which resulted in the use of wasteful transloading.  An early form of containerisation had been considered by Brunel; his sketchbook of 10 July 1845 has a drawing of a hoist to tranship loose bodies from broad to narrow gauge frames.  Three months later, this method was referred to in Brunel's evidence to the Gauge Commission on 25 October 1845.

A Royal Commission was set up to study the issue and report its recommendations. The report informed the Regulating the Gauge of Railways Act 1846, which mandated standard gauge for all new railway construction except in the southwest of England and certain lines in Wales. However, building new broad gauge lines was still legal if an Act of Parliament permitted an exception for a new line. The broad gauge thus continued in common use in the West of England for several more decades.

See also 

The topic is further examined in articles describing specific railways:
 from the Great Western Railway point of view: 
 from the London and South Western Railway:

References

Bibliography

Works cited

Further reading
 E T MacDermot, History of the Great Western Railway, vol I, published by the Great Western Railway, London, 1927
 R A Williams, The London & South Western Railway, volume 1, David & Charles, Newton Abbot, 1968

History of rail transport in the United Kingdom
Business rivalries